Ingrid Bolsø Berdal (born 2 March 1980) is a Norwegian actress. She started her career with the 2005 short film Limbo. Her first leading role was in the Norwegian slasher film Cold Prey, released in October 2006. She has since appeared in over fourteen films, including Chernobyl Diaries, Hansel & Gretel: Witch Hunters, and Hercules. Since 2016, she has played the role of Armistice in the HBO series Westworld.

Career
Berdal is the recipient of the Amanda Award (the Norwegian Film Award) for Best Actress for the film Cold Prey. She was also nominated for Best Actress for Cold Prey 2 two years later. She hosted the Norwegian Film Awards (The Amanda Awards) in 2010 and 2012. In January 2011, she opened her monologue Frøken Else at The Norwegian Theatre, receiving positive reviews.

In 2014, she played the only female warrior, Atalanta, in the film Hercules.

Filmography

Film

Television
Codename Hunter (2006)
Thomas P (2007)
Eve and Adam (2007)
Codename Hunter 2 (2008)
Heart to Heart 2 (2010)
Hellfjord (2012)
Westworld (2016–2018)
Kieler Street (2018)
Witch Hunt (2020)
Stardust (2020)

Stage
Kristin-spelet at Sel (2004)
Ned til Sol at Det Norske Teatret (2005)
Trollprisen at Det Norske Teatret (2005)
The Caucasian Chalc Circle at Det Norske Teatret (2006)
Bikubesong at Det Norske Teatret (2006)
Frank at Det Norske Teatret (2006)
Hair at Det Norske Teatret (2007)
Black Milk at Det Norske Teatret (2007)
Ivanov at Det Norske Teatret (2007)
Yvonne, Princess of Burgundy at Det Norske Teatret (2008)
The Experiment Jo Strømgren Kompani (2010)
Frøken Else at Det Norske Teatret (2011)
Baby at The Norwegian Theatre (2013)

References

External links

1980 births
Living people
Norwegian country singers
People from Inderøy
Norwegian stage actresses
Norwegian film actresses
Norwegian television actresses
Oslo National Academy of the Arts alumni
21st-century Norwegian actresses
21st-century Norwegian singers
21st-century Norwegian women singers